For the British expedition to the Red Sea (1801) the British government hired a number of transport vessels.
The transports supported Major-General Sir David Baird's expedition in 1801 to the Red Sea. Baird was in command of the Indian army that was going to Egypt to help General Ralph Abercromby expel the French there. Baird landed at Kosseir, on the Egyptian side of the Red Sea. He then led his troops army across the desert to Kena on the Nile, and then to Cairo. He arrived in time for the battle of Alexandria. Captain Hardie of Shah Kaikusroo was appointed Commodore of the fleet of country ships.

Most of the transports were "country ships". Country ships were vessels that were registered in ports of British India such as Bombay and Calcutta, and that traded around India, with Southeast Asia, and China, but that did not sail to England without special authorization from the EIC. In addition, some of the transports were "regular ships" of the British East India Company (EIC), and some were "extra ships". Regular ships were on a long-term contract with the EIC, and extra ships were vessels the EIC had chartered for one or more voyages.

The data in the table below comes primarily from an 1814 report from a Select Committee of the House of Commons of the British Parliament, which provided the data only on country ships, giving the names of a large number of vessels, and their burthen (bm).

Also, transliteration of non-English names shows no consistency across sources, making it extremely difficult to try to find more information about the vessels in question.

Country ships

EIC naval vessels
The following vessels were listed in the 1814 report as country ships, but were actually vessels of the EIC's navy, the Bombay Marine.

Citations

References
 
 
  
 
 Reports and Papers on the Impolicy of Employing Indian Built Ships in the Trade of the East-India Company, and of Admitting Them to British Registry: With Observation on Its Injurious Consequences to the Landed and Shipping Interests, and to the Numerous Branches of Trade Dependent on the Building and Equipment of British-built Ships. (1809). (London:Blacks and Parry).
 
 

Age of Sail merchant ships of England
Lists of sailing ships
Lists of ships of the United Kingdom